Lotfi Jbara (born 19 June 1961) is a Tunisian footballer and later manager.

References

1961 births
Living people
Tunisian footballers
Association football defenders
Tunisia international footballers
Tunisian football managers
Fanja SC managers
DRB Tadjenanet managers
Tunisian expatriate football managers
Expatriate football managers in Oman
Tunisian expatriate sportspeople in Oman
Expatriate football managers in Algeria
Tunisian expatriate sportspeople in Algeria